The 2021 Woking Borough Council election took place on 6 May 2021 to elect members of Woking Borough Council in England. This was on the same day as other local elections. Across the whole of Surrey there was also the Surrey County Council election and the election to be Surrey’s Police and Crime Commissioner (PCC). The Woking Borough Council election and the Surrey PCC election had both been delayed by a year because of the coronavirus pandemic. After the Borough elections the Conservative Party remained, by a margin of just one seat, the largest party on Woking Borough Council. Conservative Councillor Ayesha Azad continued to lead a Conservative minority administration, although the Council’s committee chairmanships were taken by opposition councillors.

Results Summary

Changes in votes and in percentage point performance etc. in the overall Results Summary chart, and in the individual Ward Results charts, relate to the most recent previous Borough election results in 2019. However, the net changes in the overall number of councillors by Party in the Results Summary chart relate back to the equivalent results in 2016 (i.e. when the councillors re-standing in 2021 last fought their seats).

Going into these elections, the ruling Conservative minority administration had 14 councillors, the Liberal Democrats had 10, Labour had 3 and there were 3 Independents. Cllr Graham Christie, who had defected from the Conservatives to the LibDems in 2019, failed to secure re-election in his Pyrford ward in his new political colours.

Following the elections, the council was described by one local newspaper as "going into disarray" as no party leader appeared particularly keen to be the Leader of the hung council. In the end, the Conservatives took charge and Cllr Ayesha Azad continued to run the council as a minority administration

Ward Results

Byfleet and West Byfleet

Canalside

Goldsworth Park

Heathlands

Hoe Valley

Horsell

Knaphill

Mount Hermon

Pyrford
Note that Graham Chrystie was previously elected as a Conservative councillor for the Pyrford ward, but defected to the Liberal Democrats, as a sitting councillor, in April 2019.

St. John's

References

Woking
Woking Borough Council elections